((CompetitionRecord(1st) 2012))
((CompetitionRecord(1st) 2014))
((CompetitionRecord(1st) 2015))
((CompetitionRecord(1st) 2018))
((CompetitionRecord(1st) 2019))
((CompetitionRecord(1st) 2020))

Grant Connors (born December 22, 1973) is a powerlifter and professional strongman competitor from Canada. Grant is a 14 time winner of Atlantic Canada's Strongest Man, and has competed in Canada's Strongest Man on numerous occasions.

Personal Records
Squat - 
Bench press - 
Deadlift -

References

1973 births
Living people
Canadian powerlifters
Canadian strength athletes
Male powerlifters
People from Kentville, Nova Scotia
Sportspeople from Nova Scotia